Ah, But Your Land Is Beautiful is the third novel of Alan Paton, the South African author who is best known for writing Cry, the Beloved Country. Ah, But Your Land is Beautiful is an anti-apartheid novel, in a similar vein to Cry, the Beloved Country. It is a fictional reworking of Paton's own years working as a political activist and of the experience he gained working as the president of the Liberal Party of South Africa.

In the foreword, Paton describes how the book contains both real and fictitious characters, but that two of the real characters were still alive at the time of his writing. They were Helen Joseph and Archbishop Trevor Huddleston, both of whom gave permission for Paton to introduce them, without sight of the text. Other real characters, who were dead at the time of publication, were Albert Lutuli, Dr. Monty Naicker, Patrick Duncan, Advocate Donald Barkly Molteno and Archbishop Geoffrey Clayton. He also describes the novel as set in the years 1952 to 1958.

Plot summary
The novel has multiple storylines that alternate one another, all reminiscent of the true-life experiences faced by Alan Paton and his political colleagues in resisting National Party rule in South Africa during the 1950s.

The book is divided into six parts:

Part One: The Defiance Campaign

Part Two: The Cleft Stick

Part Three: Come Back, Africa

Part Four: Death of a Traitor

Part Five: The Holy Church of Zion

Part Six: Into the Golden Age

It was originally conceived as the first part of a trilogy.

References

1981 novels
20th-century South African novels
Apartheid novels
Novels by Alan Paton
Novels set in South Africa
Jonathan Cape books